Heliport Sanatorium Dr. Schenk  is a private, medical use only heliport located in Schruns, Vorarlberg, Austria.

See also
List of airports in Austria

References

External links 
 Airport record for Heliport Sanatorium Dr. Schenk at Landings.com

Airports in Austria
Transport in Vorarlberg